Final Zone (known in Japan as FZ War Chronicle Axis/FZ戦記アクシス) is an isometric  scrolling shooter created by Wolf Team for Telenet Japan and its Renovation Products subsidiary in 1990. Players take on the role of a mecha operator outfitted in the NAP suit. The NAP suit can carry 14 weapons out of the 20 available weapons and it is up to the player to use them to their maximum benefit.

Plot
The player assumes the role of Howard Bowie, the heroic soldier of the El Sharia Military Nation's foreign legion and commander of the unit known as "Team Undead". It is 100 years in the future and weapons of mass destruction have been banned from the field of war. Fighting is now done with the futuristic power armor known as the New Age Power Suit (NAP). Howard is assigned to use his K-19 Phantom NAP to infiltrate enemy territory to Point A-46K Bloody Axis and destroy the sole remaining weapon of mass destruction.

Gameplay
Players must traverse various battlefields and destroy a requisite number of specific enemy types in order to proceed to the end-level boss. Players can collect a large amount of weapons, but can only equip and use two at a time. Players can also equip a primary weapon to the NAP's arm and a side weapon attached to the NAP's back. Doing so unleashes one of two different variations of attack the weapon offers. However, if the NAP suit is too heavily damaged, most of the weapons the player has collected previously will be lost, as well as the use of their side weapon.

References

External links

1990 video games
Video games about mecha
Sega Genesis games
Shooter video games
Video games with isometric graphics
Wolf Team games
X68000 games
Video games developed in Japan
Video games scored by Motoi Sakuraba
Telenet Japan games
Single-player video games
Science fiction video games